Araschnia is a genus of the family Nymphalidae found in the East Palearctic (temperate Asia). The seasonal polyphenism (difference between spring and summer forms) is very marked.

Species
In alphabetical order:
 Araschnia burejana (Bremer, 1861)
 Araschnia davidis Poujade, 1885
 Araschnia dohertyi Moore, 1899
 Araschnia doris Leech, 1893
 Araschnia levana (Linnaeus, 1758) – map 
 Araschnia oreas Leech, 1892
 Araschnia prorsoides (Blanchard, 1871) – Mongol 
 Araschnia zhangi Chou, 1994

References

Further reading
 "Le genre Araschnia" in French Wikipedia provides distribution information

External links
Images representing Araschnia  at Consortium for the Barcode of Life
Images representing Araschnia at Encyclopedia of Life

 
Butterfly genera
Taxa named by Jacob Hübner